Aristolochia gibertii is a species of perennial plant in the family Aristolochiaceae. It is found in Argentina, Bolivia, and Paraguay.

References

External links

gibertii